The Quinkan velvet gecko (Oedura jowalbinna) is a gecko endemic to Australia.

References

Oedura
Reptiles described in 2008
Taxa named by Conrad J. Hoskin
Taxa named by Megan Higgie
Geckos of Australia
IUCN Red List near threatened species